Martin Hoffmann (1653–1719) was an important German luthier, based in Leipzig. He was the father of Johann Christian Hoffmann (1683–1750), an important luthier, violin maker, and a friend and associate of Johann Sebastian Bach.

References

German luthiers
17th-century German businesspeople
1653 births
1719 deaths
Musicians from Leipzig